Haiyan Huang is a Chinese-American biostatistician. She works as a professor of statistics at the University of California, Berkeley, where she directs the Center for Computational Biology. She is the coauthor of highly cited work on the human genome, published as part of the ENCODE research consortium, and has also published foundational work on the statistical modeling of experimental reproducibility.

Education and career
Huang graduated from Peking University in 1997, with a bachelor's degree in mathematics, and earned her Ph.D. at the University of Southern California in 2001. Her dissertation, Bounds for the Errors in Word Count Distributional Approximations, was supervised by Larry Goldstein. After postdoctoral research with Wing Hung Wong and Jun S. Liu at Harvard University, she joined the Berkeley statistics department in 2003.

Recognition
She was named to the 2022 class of Fellows of the Institute of Mathematical Statistics, for "outstanding research in applied statistics, computational biology and applied probability and major contributions to institutional establishment of computational biology within data science". In 2022 she was also named as a Fellow of the American Statistical Association.

References

External links
Home page
Huang group

Year of birth missing (living people)
Living people
American statisticians
Chinese statisticians
Women statisticians
Peking University alumni
University of Southern California alumni
University of California, Berkeley College of Letters and Science faculty
Fellows of the Institute of Mathematical Statistics
Fellows of the American Statistical Association